The Wilshire 4500 Completion Index, more commonly the Wilshire 4500, is a capitalization-weighted index of all stocks actively traded in the United States with the exception of the stocks included in the S&P 500 index.  The index is created by removing the stocks in the S&P 500 Index from the Wilshire 5000.

Many managers of small-cap and mid-cap funds use the Wilshire 4500 as a performance benchmark. The Thrift Savings Plan's small-cap fund used this index, although it now tracks the Dow Jones U.S. Completion Total Stock Market Index.

See also
Wilshire 5000
Wilshire Associates
 Russell Small Cap Completeness Index

External links 
 https://web.archive.org/web/20140126081314/http://web.wilshire.com/Indexes/Broad/Wilshire4500/

American stock market indices